Federal elections were held in Germany on 27 October 1881. The Centre Party became the largest party in the Reichstag, with 100 of the 397 seats, whilst the National Liberal Party, which had previously been the largest party, was reduced to 45 seats. Voter turnout was 56.3%.

Results

Alsace-Lorraine

References

Federal elections in Germany
Germany
1881 elections in Germany
Elections in the German Empire
October 1881 events